Michael Arthur Hill (born 17 April 1949) is an English Anglican bishop. He was the Bishop of Bristol from 2003 until he retired effective 30 September 2017.

Early life and education
Hill was born on 17 April 1949, to Arthur and Hilda Hill. He was educated at Wilmslow County Grammar School, Fitzwilliam College, Cambridge and at Ridley Hall, Cambridge.

Ordained ministry
He was ordained a deacon at Petertide 1977 (26 June) and a priest the next Petertide (2 July 1978), both times by Donald Coggan, Archbishop of Canterbury, at Canterbury Cathedral. From 1977 to 1980 he was curate of St Mary Magdalene's, Addiscombe; and, from 1980 to 1983, of St Paul's Slough. From 1983 to 1990 he was priest in charge of St Leonard's Chesham Bois. In 1990 he became Rural Dean of Amersham and the Archdeacon of Berkshire in 1992. From 1998 to 2003 he was the area Bishop of Buckingham; he was ordained and consecrated a bishop on 19 March 1998 at Southwark Cathedral.

In December 2012, he became Chair of the Wycliffe Hall Council.

Hill withdrew from public ministry in June 2020 while the subject of a racism inquiry conducted by a Church of England tribunal. In January 2021, he was "formally rebuked" having admitted that he had used racial stereotypes in a letter of reference for a fellow clergyman.

Styles
 The Reverend Mike Hill (1977–1992)
 The Venerable Mike Hill (1992–1998)
 The Right Reverend Mike Hill (1998–present)

References

1949 births
Alumni of Fitzwilliam College, Cambridge
Alumni of Ridley Hall, Cambridge
Bishops of Buckingham
Bishops of Bristol
Archdeacons of Berkshire
Living people
People from Winterbourne, Gloucestershire
21st-century Church of England bishops
20th-century Church of England bishops